Khatima Legislative Assembly constituency is one of the seventy electoral Uttarakhand Legislative Assembly constituencies of Uttarakhand state in India. It includes Khatima area of Udham Singh Nagar district and is a part of Nainital-Udhamsingh Nagar (Lok Sabha constituency).

Members of Vidhan Sabha

Election results

2022 

 

-->

2017

2002
Source:
 Gopal Singh (Congress) : 22,588 votes  
 Dan Singh (BSP) : 11,844
 Sushama Rana (BJP) : 8648

See also
 List of constituencies of the Uttarakhand Legislative Assembly
 Udham Singh Nagar district

References

External link
  

Assembly constituencies of Uttarakhand
Udham Singh Nagar district